Kazemabad (also Romanized as Kāz̧emābād; also known as Qāsemābād and Qāsimābād) is a village in Tus Rural District, in the Central District of Mashhad County, Razavi Khorasan Province, Iran. At the 2006 census, its population was 677, in 172 families.

References 

Populated places in Mashhad County